Glenn Edward Moses Jr. (born June 7, 1980) is an American former competition swimmer and breaststroke specialist who is an Olympic gold medalist, world champion, and former world record-holder.  He represented the United States at the 2000 Summer Olympics, where he won a gold and silver medal.

On January 23, 2002 in Stockholm, Sweden, Moses set a world record in the short course 100-meter breaststroke (57.47). In January 2002, Moses also set the world mark in the short course 200-meter breaststroke, which he lowered again with a time of 2:02.92 in Berlin on January 17, 2004.

Moses was a contestant on the television program Mental Samurai on April 16, 2019. He answered 10 out of 12 questions correctly but then ran out of time.

Career
Moses was born in Loma Linda, California, to U.S. Air Force colonel Glenn Edward and schoolteacher Sissy Moses. He did not begin swimming year-round until his senior year of high school.

Moses swam for the University of Virginia and won in the 100-meter and 200-meter breaststroke events at the 2000 NCAA Division I Championships, setting world records for both events (in 2000 the NCAAs were swum short course meters, allowing for world records). He graduated from the University of Virginia in 2004 with a degree in sports medicine. He has also volunteered as an assistant coach at the University.

Leading into the 2000 Olympic Games, Moses broke an American record at the 2000 U.S. Olympic Trials. At the 2000 Olympics he won two medals: silver in the 100-meter breaststroke and gold as a member of the USA's world record-setting 4 × 100 medley relay.

On Nov. 5, 2010 SwimmingWorld.TV announced that Ed Moses was making a comeback. As part of his return to swimming, Moses swam at the 2011 U.S. Masters Short Course Nationals.

Post swimming
Moses continued his sporting career as a semi-professional golfer. He co-founded MoJo Marketing & Media, a creative content consulting company. He currently serves as a vice president. He is also pursuing an MBA degree at UCLA Anderson School of Management

In 2009 Moses appeared on Golf Channel's Big Break Disney Golf where he was eliminated in the first episode. In 2017, he appeared as a contestant on the Netflix reality series Ultimate Beastmaster, finishing second in his episode.

See also

 List of Olympic medalists in swimming (men)
 List of University of Virginia people
 List of World Aquatics Championships medalists in swimming (men)
 World record progression 50 metres breaststroke
 World record progression 100 metres breaststroke
 World record progression 200 metres breaststroke
 World record progression 4 × 100 metres medley relay

References

External links
 
 
 
 
 

  

1980 births
Living people
American male breaststroke swimmers
World record setters in swimming
Medalists at the 2000 Summer Olympics
Olympic gold medalists for the United States in swimming
Olympic silver medalists for the United States in swimming
People from Loma Linda, California
Swimmers at the 1999 Pan American Games
Swimmers at the 2000 Summer Olympics
Virginia Cavaliers men's swimmers
World Aquatics Championships medalists in swimming
Pan American Games gold medalists for the United States
Pan American Games medalists in swimming
Medalists at the 1999 Pan American Games